Clermont-Dessous is a commune in the Lot-et-Garonne department in south-western France.

History
Clermont-Dessous was once a stronghold in Agenais to which the village of Fortic was later attached. The place was besieged in vain in 1221 by Amaury de Monfort, and was taken by routiers in 1457. 

In the middle years of the nineteenth century, fairs were held on March 7, October 19, and December 13th.

Administration
List of mayors since 1793:

The town hall is located at Fourtic, a village crossed by the road from Bordeaux to Toulouse.

See also
Communes of the Lot-et-Garonne department

Citations

Sources
 

Clermontdessous